Aleksandr Orlov, Alexander Orlov or Alexandre Orloff is the name of the following people:

 Aleksander Orlov (1873–1948), Russian opera conductor
 Aleksandr Yakovlevich Orlov (1880-1954), Russian astronomer
 Alexander Orlov (ballet), dancer with the Ballets Russes, portrayed the Moor in the 1911 premiere of Petrushka (ballet)
 Alexander Orlov (Soviet defector) (1895–1973), Soviet intelligence officer and defector
 Alexandre Orloff (1899–1979), Russian artist
 Aleksandr Orlov (diplomat) (1907–1969), a Soviet party official and diplomat
 Alexander Sergeyevich Orlov (born in 1930s), Russian historian
 Aleksandr Sergeyevich Orlov (filmmaker) (born 1940), Soviet and Russian actor, film director and screenwriter
 Alexander Konstantinovich Orlov (diplomat) (born 1948), Ambassador of the Russian Federation to France from 2008 to 2017
 Alexander-Ali Orloff (born 1969), second son of Princess Fadia of Egypt, daughter of the deposed King Farouk of Egypt
 Aleksandr Valeryevich Orlov (born 1981), Russian athlete
 Aleksandr Orlov (curler) (born 1983), Russian curler and coach

Aleksandr Orlov is the name of this fictional character:
 Aleksandr Orlov, an anthropomorphic meerkat character from the Compare the Meerkat advertising campaign